Rafael Jaques (born 11 September 1975) is a Brazilian football manager and former player who played as a striker.

Born in Porto Alegre, Jaques played for several different clubs of which they include Grêmio, Araçatuba, Goiás, Real Betis, Rayo Vallecano, São Paulo, Sport, União de Leiria, Marítimo, CFZ de Brasília, Vila Nova, 15 de Novembro, Santo André, Wuhan Guanggu, Canoas, APOP and Sampaio Corrêa he made his debut as a coach, for the São José de Porto Alegre, leading this team in the Série C.

References

External links

1975 births
Living people
Brazilian footballers
Association football forwards
Brazilian football managers
Campeonato Brasileiro Série A players
Campeonato Brasileiro Série B players
Campeonato Brasileiro Série C players
Campeonato Brasileiro Série D players
La Liga players
Segunda División players
Primeira Liga players
Chinese Super League players
Cypriot First Division players
Brazilian expatriate footballers
Brazilian expatriate sportspeople in Spain
Brazilian expatriate sportspeople in China
Brazilian expatriate sportspeople in Cyprus
Expatriate footballers in Spain
Expatriate footballers in China
Expatriate footballers in Cyprus
Campeonato Brasileiro Série D managers
Grêmio Foot-Ball Porto Alegrense players
Associação Esportiva Araçatuba players
Goiás Esporte Clube players
São Paulo FC players
Sport Club do Recife players
Guarani FC players
Vila Nova Futebol Clube players
Clube 15 de Novembro players
Esporte Clube Santo André players
Sampaio Corrêa Futebol Clube players
Sociedade Esportiva do Gama players
Real Betis players
Rayo Vallecano players
U.D. Leiria players
C.S. Marítimo players
Wuhan Guanggu players
APOP Kinyras FC players
Esporte Clube São José managers
Clube do Remo managers
Sociedade Esportiva e Recreativa Caxias do Sul managers
Footballers from Porto Alegre